333 Market Street is a class-A office skyscraper on Market Street between Fremont and Beale in the Financial District of San Francisco, California. The , 33-story tower was designed by Gin Wong Associates, and completed in 1979.

See also

List of tallest buildings in San Francisco

References

Skyscraper office buildings in San Francisco
Financial District, San Francisco
Market Street (San Francisco)
Office buildings completed in 1979